Henrietta "Jetty" Treffz (1 July 1818, in Alsergrund – 8 April 1878, in Hietzing) was best known as the first wife of Johann Strauss II and a well-known mezzo-soprano appearing in England in 1849 to great acclaim.

Biography

Henrietta Chalupetzky was the only child of a Viennese goldsmith and studied music in Vienna, adopting her mother's maiden name, Treffz, for professional purposes. Her career took her around Austria, as well as Germany and France, but it was in England that she first appeared with Johann Strauss I in concerts that would bring her numerous accolades and felicitations. The Musical World, published in London on 5 May 1849, noted her talents: "mezzo-soprano voice of beautiful quality and remarkable for freshness and equality of tone throughout the register".

On 27 August 1862, Henrietta (known affectionately as "Jetty") Treffz married Johann Strauss II in the Stephansdom in Vienna, a marriage which was beneficial to Strauss as her support and keen musical and business sense, influenced his works and promoted them to a superior standard. His works around that time revealed his finest creative period, as she worked together with him, as a music-copyist and private secretary, as well as what we will be familiar today as a manager in the music world. Their marriage was not without skepticism. The Viennese populace, long swayed by Strauss' graceful waltzes, were shocked at the announcement of their marriage, as she was forty-four when they married, about seven years older than Strauss. Even his brother Josef Strauss expressed his concern at the match, although he eventually accepted that she was 'indispensable in the home. She writes up all accounts, copies out orchestral parts and sees to everything in the kitchen with such efficiency and kindness that is admirable' in a letter dated 2 May 1869 written to his wife, Caroline. Treffz's encouragement for Strauss to apply for the coveted "KK Hofballmusik-direktor" post eventually bore positive results, as he was awarded the honorary position in 1863.

Last years
Jetty Treffz lived long enough to see her husband claim a small but encouraging success in the operetta business, however, on 8 April 1878, she suffered a heart attack and died, aged 59, the cause being reported as a disturbing letter from one of her illegitimate sons. She often spoke of herself as a 'poor, old cripple' as well as suffering from painful illnesses in the last years of her life.

She was buried in the local Hietzing cemetery, although Strauss was absent at the funeral,  and all arrangements were left to his brother Eduard Strauss. Strauss himself remarried seven weeks later, to Ernestine Dittrich on 28 May 1878.

References

Klaus Konrad Dillmann, Das abenteuerliche Leben von Franz August Treffz, Jetty Treffz-Strauß, Germain Metternich, Weinsberg 2000.

External links
 

1818 births
1878 deaths
Operatic mezzo-sopranos
Austrian people of Czech descent
People from Alsergrund
People from Hietzing
Henrietta Treffz
19th-century Austrian women opera singers